The Nantes-Atlantic National College of Veterinary Medicine, Food Science and Engineering also known as Oniris or  Oniris Nantes, is a French educational institution. It operates under the supervision of the ministry of Agriculture. It opened on 1 January 2010 in Nantes, in the Pays de la Loire region.

Oniris was the result of the fusion of the National Veterinary School of Nantes, established in 1979, and of the National School of Agri-Food Engineering of Nantes, established in 1974.

It is one of four French national colleges training veterinary surgeons. It also trains agri-food engineers.

References

Veterinary schools in France
2010 establishments in France